The red-tailed silverside, or zona (Bedotia geayi) is a species of Madagascar rainbowfish endemic to the Mananjary River drainage in Madagascar. It is threatened by habitat loss and introduced species. It has often been confused with the related B. madagascariensis, which is common in the aquarium trade. In addition to meristics, the two can be separated by the exact colour pattern on their tail fin (males of both typically have red in the tail) and the distinct red spot on the lower jaw of breeding male B. geayi (lacking in B. madagascariensis). B. geayi was described in 1907 by Jacques Pellegrin from a type collected by the pharmacist and natural history collector  Martin François Geay (1859-1910), who Pellegrin honoured with its specific name.

References

Zona
Freshwater fish of Madagascar
Taxonomy articles created by Polbot
Fish described in 1907